Francischini is an Italian surname. Notable people with the surname include:

Felipe Francischini (born 1991), Brazilian politician and lawyer
Fernando Francischini (born 1970), Brazilian politician, father of Felipe

Italian-language surnames